Combe Incorporated, based in White Plains, New York, is an American personal-care company founded in 1949 by Ivan Combe.  Combe products are sold in 64 countries on six continents.  Ivan Combe primarily promoted the brand names instead of the company name. Combe owns the brands Just for Men, Sea-Bond, Vagisil, and Grecian Formula.

Combe was the originator of the Clearasil brand in 1950 but sold the rights to it in 1961 to Richardson-Merrell.

In October 2002, Combe acquired J.B. Williams, thereby adding such longtime names as Brylcreem, Aqua Velva and Cepacol to its brand stable.

In January 2011, Combe sold its cough remedy and skin care business to Reckitt Benckiser, and its foot care business (including Odor-Eaters) to Blistex.

Key dates 
 1949: Ivan Combe founds a company.
 1951: Combe introduces Clearasil.
 1952: The company's offices move from Manhattan to White Plains, New York.
 1961: Clearasil is sold to  Richardson-Merrell.
 1974: Combe's first manufacturing plant opens in Illinois.
 1974: Combe launches Vagisil.
 1987: Just for Men is introduced.
 2000: Ivan Combe dies.
 2002: J.B. Williams is acquired.
 2011: Sale of cold remedy/skin care business to Reckitt Benckiser, and sale of foot care business to Blistex.

References

External links
 Company web site

American companies established in 1949
Pharmaceutical companies established in 1949
Personal care companies
Pharmaceutical companies of the United States
 
Companies based in White Plains, New York
Health care companies based in New York (state)
Privately held companies based in New York (state)
1949 establishments in New York (state)